A groundling was a person who visited the Red Lion, The Rose, or the Globe theatres in the early 17th century. They were too poor to pay to be able to sit on one of the three levels of the theatre. If they paid one penny, they could stand in "the pit", also called "the yard", just below the stage, to watch the play. Standing in the pit was uncomfortable, and  people were usually packed in tightly. The groundlings were commoners who were also referred to as stinkards or penny-stinkers. The name 'groundlings' came about after Hamlet referenced them as such when the play was first performed around 1600. They were known to misbehave and are commonly believed to have thrown food such as fruit and nuts at characters / actors they did not like, although there is no evidence of this. They would watch the plays from the cramped pits with sometimes over 500 people standing there.

In 1599, Thomas Platter mentioned the cost of admission at contemporary London theatres in his diary:

See also
 Parterre
 Promenade concert

References

Stage terminology
17th-century theatre